Yachts club SMTU was an educational yacht club on Kirov Islands of St. Petersburg. 
It occupied the island of Bezymyanniy.

History 
After the creation in 1930 of the Saint Petersburg State Marine and Technological University, based on the Saint Petersburg Polytechnical University, there was a requirement for sea engineers to have training and practice opportunities. During the Second World War, students gained this practice at the Admiralty Shipyard, but towards the end of the 1940s, a new place was allocated using institute yachts, on Krestovsky island.

At the end of the 1950s, the territory of the Yacht club SMTU became an island, when a rowing canal was dug on Krestovsky island in 1958-1960. 
This new island was named Anonymous, and the city administration officially placed it under the authority of the SMTU (then known as the LMTU) in 1959.

Club held competitions which often had no prize fund; for example winners of a Quartet - 2002 cup were awarded edible fungi.  The club had access to unusual vessels, such as a trimaran, and a submarine.

The last director of the club was Jury Chistjakov,  who was in charge when the club was closed in 2003. The land is now being used for the building of a new sports centre.  This will belong to a noncommercial partnership Javara-Neva, and its president will be Vladimir Putin.

References 

Yacht clubs in Russia